Metasia dicealis is a moth of the family Crambidae described by Francis Walker in 1859. It is known from Australia, where it has been recorded from New South Wales, the Australian Capital Territory and Victoria.

The wingspan is about 20 mm.

References

Moths described in 1859
Metasia